Club de Campo Villa de Madrid is a country and sports club located in Madrid, Spain. The club was formed in 1929, and is one of the most known in the city. It has a wide array of sports facilities including two championship 18-hole golf courses, hockey pitches, tennis and padel courts, horse-riding facilities and swimming pools. 

Many are the sporting events celebrated annually at the club, including the Spain Golf Open and the Longines Global Champions Tour.

Golf
The Javier Arana designed Negro (or Black) course opened in 1956, and has hosted the Open de España on many occasions. It has also been the venue for former European Tour events, the Madrid Masters and the Open de Madrid.
The Amarillo (or Yellow) course was designed by Seve Ballesteros.

Hockey

The men's team won their first title in the 2020–21 season and the women's team have the most national titles with 22. The club hosted the 2006 Women's World Cup, won by The Netherlands.

Honours

Men
División de Honor
 Winners (1): 2020–21
 Runners-up (7): 1957–58, 1980–81, 1981–82, 1985–86, 2009–10, 2010–11, 2012–13
Copa del Rey
 Winners (13): 1934, 1935, 1936, 1940, 1953, 1954, 1956, 1977, 1978, 2004, 2005, 2011, 2012
Euro Hockey League
 Runners-up (1): 2010–11
EuroHockey Cup Winners Cup
 Winners (1) 2005
EuroHockey Indoor Club Cup
 Runners-up (1): 2009
EuroHockey Indoor Club Trophy
 Runners-up (1): 2006

Women
División de Honor
 Winners (22): 1973–74, 1974–75, 1975–76, 1983–84, 1986–87, 1987–88, 1988–89, 1989–90, 1990–91, 1991–92, 1994–95, 2003–04, 2006–07, 2008–09, 2009–10, 2010–11, 2011–12, 2013–14, 2014–15, 2016–17, 2018–19, 2020–21
Copa de la Reina
 Winners (18): 1989, 1991, 1992, 1995, 1999, 2006, 2008, 2009, 2010, 2011, 2012, 2014, 2016, 2017, 2018, 2019, 2020, 2022
Euro Hockey League
 Runners-up (1): 2021
EuroHockey Club Champions Cup
Runners-up (1): 2008
EuroHockey Club Trophy
 Winners (1): 2019
 Runners-up (2): 1989, 2017
EuroHockey Cup Winners Cup
 Winners (1): 2007
 Runners-up (1): 2009
EuroHockey Indoor Club Cup
 Runners-up (7): 2008, 2010, 2013, 2014, 2015, 2016, 2018
EuroHockey Indoor Club Trophy
 Winners (1): 2005

Current squad

Men's squad
Head coach: Pablo Usoz

Women's squad
Head coach: Eduardo Aguilar

Tennis
The club hosted the 2008 Fed Cup final, when Russia defeated Spain 4–0.

References

External links
Club de Campo Villa de Madrid

 
Golf clubs and courses in Spain
Spanish field hockey clubs
Tennis clubs in Spain
Sports venues in Madrid
Sports teams in Madrid
1929 establishments in Spain
Field hockey clubs established in 1931
Buildings and structures in Ciudad Universitaria neighborhood, Madrid